The Negros striped babbler (Zosterornis nigrorum) is a species of bird in the family Zosteropidae. It is endemic to Negros Island (Philippines).

Its natural habitat is tropical moist montane forest in the range of 900–1,600 masl. It is threatened by habitat loss.

Description 
EBird describes the bird as "A fairly small bird of lower-elevation montane forest and degraded habitat on Negros. Warm brown above and cream-colored below with fine black streaks. Note the white throat, the small white area around the eye bordered black, and the black line through the eye. Often found in mixed-species flocks. Somewhat similar to Stripe-sided and Visayan Rhabdornises, but smaller, with a white face rather than a broad black band through the eye. Voice includes high-pitched chipping notes."

It looks extremely similar to the closely related Panay striped babbler, with the differences being that the Negros striped babbler has more light and finely streaked underparts, a more distinct mask and overall lighter appearance.

Habitat and conservation status 
It inhabits montane forest between 950 and 1,600 m, chiefly occurring between 1,050 and 1,400 m, generally favouring the lower storey. It seems to tolerate degraded habitats, having been recorded in recently degraded forest, secondary forest and dense bushes at the forest edge and in forest opened up for agriculture. However, it appears to be limited to areas with some remaining forest cover.

IUCN has assessed this bird as Endangered. This species' main threat is habitat loss with wholesale clearance of forest habitats as a result of logging, agricultural conversion and mining activities occurring within the range. By 1988, Negros only had 4% forest cover remaining and reached 1,250 m on Mt. Talinis, one of its key habitats.  Among the other four striped babblers (Panay striped babbler, Palawan striped babbler and Luzon striped babbler), this bird is the most endangered with population being estimated to be just 600 - 1,700 individuals. This is due to Negros Island being one of the most deforested islands in the country and thus has a lack of suitable habitat.

The Mount Talinis /Balinsasayao Twin Lakes Natural Park area has been proposed for conservation funding. This area includes about 40 km2 of high-altitude forest, which affords indirect protection through the Negros Geothermal Reservation.  Environmental awareness campaigns have been conducted near  Mount Talinis itself. Mount Kanlaon is also a protected area if the babbler still persists there.

References 

Collar, N. J. & Robson, C. 2007. Family Timaliidae (Babblers)  pp. 70 – 291 in; del Hoyo, J., Elliott, A. & Christie, D.A. eds. Handbook of the Birds of the World, Vol. 12. Picathartes to Tits and Chickadees. Lynx Edicions, Barcelona.

Negros striped babbler
Birds of Negros Island
Negros striped babbler
Negros striped babbler
Taxonomy articles created by Polbot